In Spanish dialectology, the realization of coronal fricatives is one of the most prominent features distinguishing various dialect regions.

While an urban legend attributes the presence of the dental fricative to a Spanish king with a lisp, the various realizations of these coronal fricatives are actually a result of historical processes that date to the 15th century.

Origins

Castilian 'lisp'
A persistent urban legend claims that the prevalence of the sound  in Spanish can be traced to a Spanish king who spoke with a lisp, and whose pronunciation spread by prestige borrowing to the rest of the population. This myth has been discredited by scholars.  traces the origins of the legend to a chronicle of Pero López de Ayala which says that Peter of Castile "lisped a little". However, Peter reigned in the 14th century and the sound  began to develop in the 16th century (see below).

However, learners of Spanish in North America, where people are more familiar with  pronunciation, may misinterpret it as lisping. The misnomer "Castilian lisp" is used occasionally to refer to this aspect of Peninsular pronunciation (in both  and  varieties).

Historical evolution
During the 16th and early 17th centuries these phonemes merged differently as they evolved into those of the different modern dialects. There were four pairs of voiceless versus voiced sibilants: dental/alveolar affricates  vs.  (spelled  or  vs. ); dental/alveolar fricatives  (spelled  when intervocalic,  otherwise) vs.  (intervocalic only, spelled ); postalveolar affricates  (spelled ) vs. ; and postalveolar fricatives  (spelled ) vs. . It is likely that  deaffricated and merged with  before the year 1500.

The second step was the devoicing of voiced sibilants. This sound contrasted with two acoustically similar sounds: dentoalveolar  and apicoalveolar . Subsequent changes to the sound system of Spanish retained the contrasts while enhancing the segments by increasing articulatory distance amongst their rather subtle acoustic contrasts, an appropriate step due to the high productivity of these phonemes in differentiating frequently used minimal pairs. The dentoalveolar one was moved "forward" to interdental , losing its former sibilance in the process (which increased its acoustic distance to the remaining sibilant ), and the prepalatal one was moved "backward" to velar  also losing its former sibilance. All in all resulting in the three-way distinction found in modern Standard Peninsular pronunciation:

In the south, the devoicing process and deaffrication of  gave rise to new fricatives that were indistinguishable from the existing ones. In a number of  areas (particularly the southernmost provinces like Cádiz)  developed into a non-sibilant apico-dental , perceptually similar to the interdental  used by Standard Peninsular speakers for orthographic /. In  areas (particularly in the westernmost provinces like Seville and Huelva), the resulting phoneme developed a predorsal alveolar realization  (like English ), perceptually similar to the apicoalveolar  used by Standard Peninsular speakers for orthographic . This  variety was the pronunciation that most impacted Latin America, as many emigrants to the Americas were from Andalusian and Canarian ports. In addition, several generations of Spanish speakers had lived and grown in the Americas before  appeared in Castilian.

The development of the sibilants in Ladino (which split off from Castilian and other Peninsular varieties in the 15th century) was more conservative, resulting in a system closer to that of Portuguese.

Distinction

  represents a voiceless alveolar sibilant  (either laminal as in English, or apical);

By the early 1700s the six sibilant phonemes of medieval Spanish had all merged into three phonemes in the dialects with this distinction and two phonemes elsewhere, but spelling still reflected the older pronunciation system. From 1726 to 1815 the RAE reformed spelling, resulting in a modern Spanish orthography which reflects the system with distinction.

In most of Spain, this distinction is between an apical  and a dental .

Lack of distinction

Seseo
This can result in ambiguity but can usually be interpreted depending on the context of which the sentence is spoken.  is the most widespread pronunciation among Spanish speakers worldwide and occurs in nearly all speakers in Hispanic America. While it is a minority pronunciation in Spain itself,  is considered standard in all varieties of Latin American Spanish. Traditional dialect atlases (e.g.) show one variant or another used in adjacent regions. In Spain,  is considered "more socially acceptable or perhaps 'less substandard' than ". The following table gives an example of the three pronunciation patterns discussed so far:

Ceceo
That said, Hualde reports that there is some evidence of the phenomenon in parts of Central America. A publication of the University of Oviedo also notes that  can be found in Argentina and Chile. A similar sound characterized as a "voiceless apico-or corono-post-dental slit fricative" has been observed in Nicaragua, El Salvador, Honduras, Colombia, Puerto Rico, and Venezuela; In these places, ceceo is a largely rural pronunciation and is often stigmatized.

Salvadoran Spanish occasionally weakens, but almost never completely deletes,  in onset positions, and this  allophone is more common in onset positions than coda ones.

Ceseo or seceo
However, as, for instance, in the case of the variation between the standard velar nasal and alveolar pronunciation of the nasal in -ing in English (walking versus walkin), the switching may be entirely unconscious. It is perhaps evidence of the saliency of three-way  variation that inconsistent use has elicited evaluative comments by some traditional Spanish dialectologists. In fact, sociolinguistic variation is typically highly structured in terms of how often each variant will appear given various social and linguistic independent variables. The Spanish spoken by the inhabitants of the Canary Islands is exclusively , but exclusive  is quite rare in mainland Spain – even in areas, such as Seville, listed as being majority .

See also
 History of the Spanish language
 Spanish dialects and varieties
 Spanish phonology
 Yeísmo

References

Sources

External links 

 Articles on seseo and ceceo in the Diccionario panhispánico de dudas of the Real Academia Española
 An explanation of the development of Mediæval Spanish sibilants in Castile and Andalusia.
 A recording of the sibilants, as they would have been pronounced in medieval Spanish.

Spanish dialects
Fricative consonants
Spanish phonology
Sound laws